Brian George William Manning (14 May 1926 – 10 November 2011) was an English astronomer who discovered 19 minor planets. He was born in 1926 in Birmingham. He constructed his first mirror from a piece of glass that a World War II bomb blew out of the roof of the factory where his father worked. He began as an engineering draughtsman but later became a metrologist at the University of Birmingham. In the late 1950s, he constructed an interference-controlled ruling machine in a home workshop, which was able to rule high-quality 3 by 2 inch gratings. In 1990, he received the H. E. Dall prize of the BAA.

Discoveries 

Brian Manning is credited by the Minor Planet Center with the discovery of 19 minor planets he made at Stakenbridge Observatory (494), near Kidderminster, England, between 1989 and 1997. All of his discovered minor planets are asteroids of the main-belt:

References 
 

 Hurst, Guy M. 'Brian George William Manning' in the Journal of the British Astronomical Association, April 2012, Volume 22, Number 2.

External links 
 IAUC 3104, periodic comet Chernykh (1977l),

1926 births
2011 deaths
20th-century British astronomers
Academics of the University of Birmingham
Discoverers of minor planets
Discoveries by Brian G. W. Manning
Metrologists
People from Handsworth, West Midlands